Leo N. Sanders (March 10, 1914 – August 4, 1999) was an American Negro league shortstop between 1937 and 1942.

A native of Vian, Oklahoma, Sanders made his Negro leagues debut in 1937 with the Memphis Red Sox. He played for the Birmingham Black Barons and Kansas City Monarchs in 1940, and finished his career with the Jacksonville Red Caps in 1942. Sanders died in Muskogee, Oklahoma in 1999 at age 85.

References

External links
 and Seamheads
 Leo Sanders at Arkansas Baseball Encyclopedia

1914 births
1999 deaths
Birmingham Black Barons players
Jacksonville Red Caps players
Kansas City Monarchs players
Memphis Red Sox players
Baseball shortstops
Baseball players from Oklahoma
People from Sequoyah County, Oklahoma
20th-century African-American sportspeople